The Cormorant Scarecrow (Plašitelj kormorana) is a Croatian documentary film directed by Branko Ištvančić. It was released in 1998.

The film has received a number of awards and is seen by many as the best Croatian documentary of the 1990s.

Synopsis
The film depicts the daily lives of people whose job is to chase away cormorants that eat fish from a fish farm near Donji Miholjac, Croatia. Cormorants are protected by law and their nesting grounds are located across the border, in Hungary, which gives the protagonists' efforts a Sisyphean, absurdist feel.

References

External links

1998 films
Croatian documentary films
1990s Croatian-language films
1998 documentary films